The Sweden women's national volleyball team represents Sweden in international women's volleyball competitions and friendly matches.

Results

European Championship
 Champions   Runners-up   Third place   Fourth place

European Volleyball League
 Champions   Runners-up   Third place   Fourth place

Team
The following is the Swedish roster in the 2021 European Championship.

Head Coach: Ettore Guidetti

1 Elsa Arrestad MB

2 Sofia Andersson S

3 Linda Andersson MB

7 Sofie Sjöberg L

8 Dalila-Lilly Topic MB

9 Rebecka Lazić OS

10 Isabelle Haak OP

11 Alexandra Lazić OS

14 Hanna Hellvig OS

15 Diana Lundvall OS

16 Vilma Andersson S

17 Anna Haak OS

18 Julia Nilsson MB

21 Gabriella Lundvall L

See also
Sweden men's national volleyball team

References

External links
Current squad on the website of the Swedish volleyball federation
FIVB profile
CEV profile

National women's volleyball teams
Volleyball
Women's national team